Polyalthia glabra is a species of plant in the family Annonaceae. It is a tree endemic to Peninsular Malaysia. It is threatened by habitat loss.

References

glabra
Endemic flora of Peninsular Malaysia
Trees of Peninsular Malaysia
Critically endangered plants
Taxonomy articles created by Polbot
Taxobox binomials not recognized by IUCN